Ballarat Heritage Services, also known as BHS Publishing, is an Australian publisher in Ballarat, Victoria. It was founded in 1998 by Clare Gervasoni, Dorothy Wickham and Wayne Phillipson, to promote Victorian local and family history in historical gold mining towns of the Victorian gold rush. It also distributes historical and specialist publications which are difficult to locate. 

Ballarat Heritage Services published The Eureka Encyclopaedia, an encyclopaedia of the Eureka Rebellion written by Justin Corfield, Wickham and Gervasoni. The Encyclopaedia won the Victorian Community History Awards.

Notes

Bibliography
 Age Newspaper article on Bullboar Book
 Swiss Italian Festa
 Ballarat Courier article on Prime Ministers Australian History Prize nomination

External links
 History Victoria Victorian Community History Awards
 Ballarat Heritage Services

Book publishing companies of Australia
Publishing companies established in 1989